The Department of Finance (DOF) is the executive department of the Philippine government responsible for the formulation, institutionalization and administration of fiscal policies, management of the financial resources of the government, supervision of the revenue operations of all local government units, the review, approval and management of all public sector debt, and the rationalization, privatization and public accountability of corporations and assets owned, controlled or acquired by the government.

History
The Department of Finance was established on March 17, 1897, at the same time that the Revolutionary Government was founded in Naic, Cavite. General Baldomero Aguinaldo was appointed Director of Finance by General Emilio Aguinaldo. The Finance Director became the Secretary of the Treasury under the first constitutional republican government, the Biak-na-Bato Republic.

In 1901, the Department of Finance and Justice was formally organized by virtue of an act passed by the Civil Service Commission, which was headed by William Howard Taft. Gregorio Araneta was the first Filipino appointed Secretary of Justice and Finance. In 1916, through Reorganization Act No. 2666 of the Philippine Legislature, the Department of Finance and Justice was split into two independent departments.

In 1936, DOF functions relative to the formulation and preparation of the Government's budget were transferred to the newly created Budget Commission. The preparation of income and resource estimates remained with the department. In 1949, the Central Bank of the Philippines was established, Secretary of Finance Miguel Cuaderno relinquished the Finance portfolio to Pio Pedrosa to enable him to serve as Governor of the Central Bank.

In 1970, Minister Cesar E. A. Virata, concurrently Prime Minister, was appointed Secretary. In 1974, with the adoption of the parliamentary form of government, the department was changed to a ministry.

In the 1980s, as government policy turned increasingly interventionist in the economy, the Ministry became the voice of caution. It spearheaded the creation of inter-agency committees to rationalize the otherwise free-for-all system of allocating government resources.  The Investment Coordination Committee (ICC) was created to rationalize government investments, the Government Corporate Monitoring and Coordinating Committee (GCMCC) to reform the government corporate sector and the Fiscal to reverse the proliferation of the fiscal incentives.

In 1987, the Ministry of Finance was reverted to a department following the ratification of the 1987 Constitution which provided for a presidential form of government. Accordingly, the department was reorganized and its organizational structure, distribution of powers and functions, and coordination mechanisms were streamlined. In 1988, the Value Added Tax was introduced and replaced a complicated sales tax structure.

Through the Department's policies, which resulted in sound fiscal and monetary conditions, the Philippines was hailed as "Asia's Newest Tiger" by various international credit institutions and in 1997, the National Government recorded a budget surplus for the third consecutive year, and the public sector generated its fiscal surplus since the sector started to be monitored in 1985.

In 2004, the Japan Credit Rating Agency (JCRA) maintained its credit rating of "BBB" for the Philippines’ long-term foreign currency and domestic currency long-term senior debts for the government's ability to manage its deficit and macro fundamentals. The rating is two notches higher than those of non-Asian rating agencies such as Moody's, Standard and Poor's, and Fitch.

List of the Secretaries of the Department of Finance

Organizational structure
The department is headed by the Secretary of Finance (Philippines), with the following undersecretaries and assistant secretaries.*

Undersecretary for Fiscal Policy and Monitoring Group
Undersecretary for Revenue Generation and Local Finance Group
Undersecretary for International Finance Group
Undersecretary for Privatization and Corporate Affairs Group
Undersecretary for Policy Development and Management Services Group
Undersecretary for Legal Services Group
Undersecretary for Revenue Integrity Protection Service
Undersecretary, Office of the Chief Economist
Assistant Secretary for Fiscal Policy and Monitoring Group
Assistant Secretary for Revenue Generation and Local Finance Group
Assistant Secretary for International Finance Group
Assistant Secretary for Privatization and Corporate Affairs Group
Assistant Secretary for Legal Services Group
Assistant Secretary for Information Management Service
Assistant Secretary, Office of the Chief Economist

Offices

Bureaus
 Bureau of Internal Revenue (BIR)
 Bureau of Customs (BOC)
Bureau of Local Government Finance (BLGF)
 Bureau of the Treasury (BTr)

Offices
 Central Administration Office
Central Financial Management Office
 Financial and Fiscal Policy and Planning Office
Internal Audit Service
 International Finance Policy Office
 International Finance Operations Office
Privatization and Management Office (PMO)
 Revenue Integrity Protection Service

Agencies and Corporations
 Central Board of Assessment Appeal (CBAA)
Insurance Commission (IC)
 National Tax Research Center (NTRC)
 Philippine Crop Insurance Corporation (PCIC)
 Philippine Guarantee Corporation (PHILGUARANTEE)
Philippine Tax Academy (PTA)
 Securities and Exchange Commission (SEC)
 Land Bank of the Philippines

References

External links
Department of Finance Philippines website

 
Philippines, Finance
Philippines
Finance
Government finances in the Philippines